The Maragang or Kimaragang people are an indigenous ethnic group residing in Sabah, eastern Malaysia on the island of Borneo. They reside in the Kota Marudu and Pitas districts of Kudat Division. Their population was estimated at 10,000 in the year 1987. They are considered a sub-group of the Kadazan-Dusun, as their language (ISO 639-3 kqr) belongs to the Dusunic branch of the Austronesian language family. They are primarily farmers, raising paddy rice, cocoa, and cash crops.

References 

Indigenous peoples of Southeast Asia
Kadazan-Dusun people
Ethnic groups in Sabah